Pegswood is a railway station on the East Coast Main Line, which runs between  and . It is owned by Network Rail and managed by Northern Trains.

History
The station was opened by the North Eastern Railway on 1 January 1903, to serve the nearby village and colliery. The line passing through the station, which was constructed by the Newcastle and Berwick Railway during the 1840s, had opened more than fifty years earlier.

The station was twice threatened with closure after nationalisation. The first attempt to close the station was made in 1958, with a further attempt made in 1966, during the Beeching cuts. The station was reprieved each time.

An average of 3 or 4 services each way per day ran to and from Berwick-upon-Tweed and Edinburgh Waverley until the 1980s. Following the electrification of the East Coast Main Line, these services were curtailed to Berwick-upon-Tweed. Services were further cut (and reduced in frequency to the present residual level) by British Rail in May 1991, due to a shortage of rolling stock.

The local rail user group, SENRUG, has been campaigning to improve service levels at the station, and at neighbouring Widdrington, since September 2016.

Facilities
The station has two platforms with basic facilities. A waiting shelter is located on the Newcastle-bound platform. There is step-free access to both platforms, which are linked by road bridge.

Pegswood is not part of the Northern Trains penalty fare network, as a ticket machine has not yet been installed at the station.

Services

As of the December 2021 timetable change, the station is served by one train per day (excluding Sunday) towards Chathill, and two trains towards Newcastle via Morpeth. All services are operated by Northern Trains.

Rolling stock used: Class 156 Super Sprinter and Class 158 Express Sprinter

References

External links
 

Railway stations in Northumberland
DfT Category F2 stations
Former North Eastern Railway (UK) stations
Railway stations in Great Britain opened in 1903
Northern franchise railway stations
1903 establishments in England
railway station